National Institute of Natural Fibre Engineering and Technology (NINFET), formerly National Institute of Research on Jute and Allied Fibre Technology (NIRJAFT), is an institute under Indian Council of Agricultural Research, Government of India and dedicated to the research of jute and allied fibres leading to the diversified use and industrial growth.

References

External links
http://www.nirjaft.res.in/

Research institutes in West Bengal
Research institutes in Kolkata
Multidisciplinary research institutes
Educational institutions established in 1939
1939 establishments in India